The S5G reactor was a prototype naval reactor designed for the United States Navy to provide electricity generation and propulsion on submarines. The S5G designation stands for:

 S = Submarine platform
 5 = Fifth generation core designed by the contractor
 G = General Electric was the contracted designer

Design 
The S5G was a pressurized water reactor plant with two coolant loops and two steam generators. It had to be designed with the reactor vessel situated low in the boat and the steam generators high in order for natural circulation of the primary coolant to be developed and maintained.

Reactor primary coolant pumps are one of the primary sources of noise from submarines, and the elimination of coolant pumps and associated equipment would also reduce mechanical complexity and the space required by propulsion equipment.

The S5G had primary coolant pumps, but they were only needed for very high speeds. And since the reactor core was designed with very smooth paths for the coolant, the coolant pumps were smaller and quieter than the ones used by the competing S5W core. They were also fewer in number. In most cases the submarine could be operated without using coolant pumps at all.  The quiet design resulted in a larger hull diameter but required larger primary coolant piping than the competing S5W reactor. Due to the larger size, the S5G was not used in subsequent attack submarines, but was a precursor to the S8G reactor design used in the larger s.

To further reduce engine plant noise, the normal propulsion setup of two steam turbines driving the screw through a reduction gear unit was changed instead to one large propulsion turbine with no reduction gears. This eliminated the noise from the main reduction gears, but the cost was to have a huge main propulsion turbine. The turbine was cylindrical, about 12 feet in diameter, and about 30 feet long. This massive size was necessary to allow it to turn slowly enough to directly drive the screw and be fairly efficient in doing so. The same propulsion setup was used on both the USS Narwhal and the land-based prototype.

The concept of a natural circulation plant was relatively new when the Navy requested this design. The prototype plant in Idaho was therefore given quite a rigorous performance shakedown to determine if such a design would work for the US Navy. It was largely a success, although the design never became the basis for any more fast-attack submarines besides the Narwhal. The prototype testing included the simulation of essentially the entire engine room of an attack submarine. Floating the plant in a large pool of water allowed the prototype to be rotated along its long axis to simulate a hard turn, accomplished by torquing large gyroscopes mounted forward of the reactor compartment. This was necessary to determine whether natural circulation would continue even during hard turns, since natural circulation is dependent on gravity whereas submarines are known to maneuver at various angles.

History 
This nuclear reactor was installed both at a land-based prototype—initially used for testing the concept and, later, for training thousands of Navy operators—at the Naval Reactor Facility, Idaho National Laboratory near Arco, Idaho, and in the USS Narwhal (SSN-671); both have been decommissioned. It was intended to test the potential contribution of natural circulation technology to submarine quieting.

Built in the early 1960s, the S5G prototype was permanently shut down in May 1995.

References

External links
 Stacy, Susan M (2000). "Proving the Principle, A History of The Idaho National Engineering and Environmental Laboratory, 1949-1999", (Chapter 10) 

 

United States naval reactors